Henry Howell (29 November 1890 – 9 July 1932) was an English footballer and cricketer who played five cricket Test matches from 1920 to 1924. He also played professional football for Wolverhampton Wanderers, Stoke, Port Vale, Southampton, Northfleet, Accrington Stanley, and Mansfield Town.

Cricket career
Born in Hockley, Warwickshire, Howell was a right-arm fast bowler and right-handed batsman who played county cricket for Warwickshire. In 1922, he helped his side to restrict Hampshire to just 15 runs in one innings; Howell took six wickets for just seven runs. He took 152 first-class wickets in the 1923 season, including the first ten-wicket haul in an innings for a Warwickshire bowler.

He played five Tests for England. His first Test was at the MCG during England's 1920–21 Ashes series with Australia. His last Test appearance was in August 1924 at The Oval against South Africa. He took seven wickets in his Test career. His younger brother Albert also played for Warwickshire between 1919 and 1922.

Football career
Howell played for Burslem Swifts and Wolverhampton Wanderers during World War I, as well as guesting for both Stoke and Port Vale. At Stoke he played in the 1916–17 and 1917–18 seasons, where he made 57 appearances, scoring 42 goals. He scored a hat-trick past Manchester City in a 5–0 win at the Victoria Ground on 9 April 1917, and then again hit a hat-trick in a 9–0 home win over Burnley on 16 March 1918. Despite only being a guest, he was Port Vale's top-scorer during the 1918–19 season with nine goals in eleven appearances.

He returned to "Wolves" in the summer of 1919, and later was signed to Southampton (without making any first-team appearances), Northfleet, Accrington Stanley (on trial) and Mansfield Town. He made a total of 38 Football League appearances with Wolves and three with Accrington Stanley.

Howell died 9 July 1932 in Selly Oak, Birmingham.

Football career statistics
Source:

References

External links

1890 births
1932 deaths
Cricketers from Birmingham, West Midlands
Footballers from Birmingham, West Midlands
English footballers
Association football forwards
Wolverhampton Wanderers F.C. players
Port Vale F.C. wartime guest players
Stoke City F.C. wartime guest players
Southampton F.C. players
Northfleet United F.C. players
Accrington Stanley F.C. (1891) players
Mansfield Town F.C. players
English Football League players
England Test cricketers
English cricketers
Warwickshire cricketers
North v South cricketers
Players cricketers
Marylebone Cricket Club cricketers
Cricketers who have taken ten wickets in an innings
English cricketers of 1919 to 1945
A. E. R. Gilligan's XI cricketers
Marylebone Cricket Club Australian Touring Team cricketers